"She's a Little Bit Country" is a single by American country music artist George Hamilton IV. Released in March 1970, it was the second single from his album Back Where It's At. The song peaked at number 3 on the Billboard Hot Country Singles chart. It also reached number 1 on the RPM Country Tracks chart in Canada.
The single was covered by singer Dean Martin, reaching #36 on Billboard's Easy Listening chart, May 1971.

Chart performance

References 

1970 singles
George Hamilton IV songs
Dean Martin songs
Songs written by Harlan Howard